The 2003–04 Iowa Hawkeyes men's basketball team represented the University of Iowa as members of the Big Ten Conference during the 2003–04 NCAA Division I men's basketball season. The team was led by fifth-year head coach Steve Alford and played their home games at Carver–Hawkeye Arena. They finished the season 16–13 overall and 9–7 in Big Ten play.

Roster

Schedule/Results

|-
!colspan=8| Non-Conference Regular Season
|-

|-
!colspan=8| Big Ten Regular Season
|-

|-
!colspan=8| Big Ten tournament

|-
!colspan=8| National Invitation Tournament

Rankings

References

Iowa Hawkeyes men's basketball seasons
Iowa
Iowa
2003 in sports in Iowa
2004 in sports in Iowa